GMG Community School District is a rural public school district headquartered in Green Mountain, Iowa.

The district is in Tama and Marshall counties, and it also serves Garwin and the surrounding rural areas.

History
The district was established in 1987, by the merger of the Garwin and Green Mountain school districts.

Schools
The district operates two schools:
 GMG Elementary School, Green Mountain
 GMG Secondary School, Garwin

Operations
The district entered into an agreement with multiple school districts to share employees; districts may share employees as a way of saving money. For example the GMG and BCLUW school districts share a superintendent, with the occupant working for BCLUW 60% of the time and GMG 40% of the time. Ben Petty, previously the principal of BCLUW High School, became the shared superintendent of GMG and BCLUW in 2011. By 2014, the GMG, BCLUW, and Hubbard–Radcliffe districts shared a single elementary guidance counselor, the GMG, BCLUW, North Tama, and Gladbrook–Reinbeck districts shared a single director of curriculum and innovation, and GMG and BCLUW had a single transportation director.

The district was previously headquartered in Garwin.

GMG Secondary School

Athletics
The Wolverines compete in the Iowa Star Conference, including the following sports:
Cross country 
Volleyball 
Football 
 1987 Class A state champions
Basketball 
Wrestling 
Track and field 
Golf 
Soccer 
Baseball 
Softball

Enrollment

See also
List of school districts in Iowa
List of high schools in Iowa

References

External links
 GMG Community School District (gmgschools.org)
 GMG Community School District (gmgschools.socs.net)
  

School districts in Iowa
Education in Marshall County, Iowa
Education in Tama County, Iowa
1992 establishments in Iowa
School districts established in 1992